is a Japanese professional baseball outfielder. He last played for the Chunichi Dragons in Japan's Nippon Professional Baseball. He played for the Dragons over a 16-year period.

Career
Hirata attended Osaka Tōin High School and was a member of the team that advanced to the semi-finals of the 2005 national championships. and tied Kazuhiro Kiyohara's record of 5 home runs at the tournament. He hit a total of 70 home runs during his three years of high school. He was drafted by the Dragons in the first round of the 2005 rookie draft.

In 2015, Hirata was made team captain of the Dragons marking the first time the Dragons had an appointed captain since Tōru Nimura in 1994.

He selected .

References

External links

NPB.com

1988 births
Living people
Chunichi Dragons players
Japanese baseball players
Nippon Professional Baseball outfielders
Baseball people from Osaka
2015 WBSC Premier12 players
2017 World Baseball Classic players